Jane Ng is a Chinese-American 3D environment artist, best known for her work on Firewatch, The Cave, and Brütal Legend. She previously worked at Campo Santo, a game studio that is part of Valve, as a Senior Environment Artist.  Other notable works include Stacking, Costume Quest, Spore, and The Godfather.

She graduated from Swarthmore College in 2001 having studied Studio Arts and Engineering.

Career 
Ng has worked in the video game industry for more than 10 years. She started her journey into the video game industry through a summer internship position at Ronin Studios.

After Ronin went out of business, she moved on to working at Electronic Arts and began work on Return of the King.

After three years of working at Electronic Arts, she moved to Double Fine Productions where she worked on titles such as Stacking, Costume Quest, and Brutal Legend. Then after 6 years of employment, she moved on to her most notable role as the lead environment artist at Campo Santo as they made their flagship title Firewatch.

References

Further reading

External links 
 

1987 births
Living people
American digital artists
Women digital artists
Swarthmore College alumni
21st-century American artists
21st-century American women artists
American artists of Chinese descent
Valve Corporation people